A rift valley is a linear lowland created by the action of a geologic rift.

Rift Valley may also refer to:

Education
 Rift Valley Academy, Christian boarding school in Kijabe, Kenya
 Rift Valley University College, private university in Ethiopia
 Rift Valley Institute, non-profit research and training organization in East Africa

Organizations
 Rift Valley Railways, manages the state-run railways of Kenya and Uganda
 Rift Valley Resources, mineral exploration company focusing on Tanzania
 Rift Valley United F.C., association football club based in Eldoret, Kenya

Other
 Rift Valley Province, former province of Kenya
 Rift Valley lakes, group of lakes in the East African Rift
 Rift Valley fever, mild to severe viral disease

See also 
 Great Rift Valley (disambiguation)
 Jordan Rift Valley
 Waimangu Volcanic Rift Valley